Galleh-ye Meshk (also known as Galleh-ye Mishi) is a village in Pian Rural District, in the Central District of Izeh County, Khuzestan Province, Iran. At the 2006 census, its population was 127, in 19 families.

References 

Populated places in Izeh County